Königin Luise ("Queen Louise") refers to Louise of Mecklenburg-Strelitz, Queen consort of Prussia.

It can also refer to:

 SS Königin Luise (1896), a German ocean liner
 SS Königin Luise (1913), a German ferry boat used as a minelayer in World War I.
 Queen Louise League (Königin-Luise-Bund), a 20th-century German pro-monarchy organization 
 Queen Luise (film) (1927–1928), a silent German film directed by Karl Grune
 Queen Louise (1957 film), a West German film with Ruth Leuwerik
 Königin-Luise-Schule, former girls' school in Königsberg
 Königin Luise, a fictional German gunboat in the book "The African Queen (novel)" and the film "The African Queen (film)"